The 2005 United States Olympic Curling Trials were held from February 19 to 26 in McFarland, Wisconsin. The trials determined which teams would represent the United States at the 2006 Winter Olympics. The trials also constituted the 2005 United States National Curling Championships, qualifying teams to the 2005 Ford World Men's Curling Championship and the 2005 Ford World Women's Curling Championship.

Men

Teams

Round robin standings

Round robin results
All times are listed in Central Standard Time.

Draw 1
Saturday, February 19, 8:00 pm

Draw 2
Sunday, February 20, 2:00 pm

Draw 3
Monday, February 21, 8:00 am

Draw 4
Monday, February 21, 4:00 pm

Draw 5
Tuesday, February 22, 10:00 am

Draw 6
Tuesday, February 22, 7:00 pm

Draw 7
Wednesday, February 23, 12:00 pm

Draw 8
Wednesday, February 23, 8:00 pm

Draw 9
Thursday, February 24, 12:00 pm

Tiebreakers
Thursday, February 24, 4:00 pm

Thursday, February 24, 8:00 pm

Playoffs

1 vs. 2
Friday, February 25, 2:00 pm

3 vs. 4
Friday, February 25, 2:00 pm

Semifinal
Friday, February 25, 7:00 pm

Final
Saturday, February 26, 2:00 pm

Women

Teams

Round robin standings

Round robin results
All times are listed in Central Standard Time.

Draw 1
Saturday, February 19, 4:00 pm

Draw 2
Sunday, February 20, 10:00 am

Draw 3
Sunday, February 20, 7:00 pm

Draw 4
Monday, February 21, 12:00 pm

Draw 5
Monday, February 21, 8:00 pm

Draw 6
Tuesday, February 22, 2:00 pm

Draw 7
Wednesday, February 23, 8:00 am

Draw 8
Wednesday, February 23, 4:00 pm

Draw 9
Thursday, February 24, 8:00 am

Tiebreaker
Thursday, February 24, 4:00 pm

Playoffs

1 vs. 2
Friday, February 25, 2:00 pm

3 vs. 4
Friday, February 25, 2:00 pm

Semifinal
Friday, February 25, 7:00 pm

Final
Saturday, February 26, 10:00 am

References

External links

2005 in curling
United States Olympic Curling Trials
United States National Curling Championships
2005 in American sports
Women's curling competitions in the United States
Curling in Wisconsin
2005 in sports in Wisconsin